The Snake Run, also known as Albany Snake Run and Albany Skate Track, is a skatepark in Albany, Western Australia. The park is the oldest community funded skatepark in Australia and the second oldest in the world.

The impetus for a dedicated skatepark came following the death of a skateboarder in Albany's main street in the mid-1970s.
In 1975 a group of students from Albany Senior High School formed a committee with the idea of building a skatepark. The group started fundraising and soon accumulated 3,000. The Albany Town Council donated  of land that was once a gravel quarry and donated 10,000 to the project.

The track was opened in February 1976 by the American skateboarder Russ Howell.

The track is curved downward and lipped with a wall on first turn with lower rises on the next two turns and finishing with a drained bowl at the end.

The park was heritage listed in 2016, making it one of the only three skateparks in the world that have heritage status.

See also
 List of places on the State Register of Heritage Places in the City of Albany

References

Heritage places in Albany, Western Australia
Skateparks in Australia
State Register of Heritage Places in the City of Albany